= Jaime Balius =

Jaume Balius i Vila (Barcelona, 1750 - Còrdova, 1822), Spanish Jaime Balius y Vila, was a Catalan classical composer.

== Works and recordings ==
- Adonde infiel dragón – Jaime Balius & Ignace Pleyel Música para la Catedral de Córdoba en el ocaso del clasicismo Vanni Moretto, director María Hinojosa, soprano Orquesta Barroca de Sevilla
